Upper Amherst Cove, is a local service district and designated place in the Canadian province of Newfoundland and Labrador.

History 
The nearest post office dates back to 1864 in Trinity Bay.

Geography 
Upper Amherst Cove is in Newfoundland within Subdivision G of Division No. 7. It is near Bonavista, just off Route 235.

Demographics 

Government 
Upper Amherst Cove is a local service district (LSD) that is governed by a committee responsible for the provision of certain services to the community. The chair of the LSD committee is David Borland.

See also 
List of communities in Newfoundland and Labrador
List of designated places in Newfoundland and Labrador
List of local service districts in Newfoundland and Labrador

References 

Populated coastal places in Canada
Designated places in Newfoundland and Labrador
Local service districts in Newfoundland and Labrador